This List of synagogues in Hungary contains active, otherwise used and destroyed synagogues in Hungary.
This article  'contains synagogues'  built in the historical Hungary area, broken down by county. Most of the synagogues listed are no longer in use or have other non-religious functions, and some have been demolished.

At the beginning of the 20th century, there were Jewish communities in many settlements of the Kingdom of Hungary, which eventually built their own church, synagogue. Most of these buildings were built with extremely sophisticated artistic exterior and interior designs. There were many Classicist style, many Romantic, many Eclectic and some Art Nouveau. It was designed to be more monumental in size to show the greatness and richness of the equalized and enriching Jewry of the turn of the century - similar to the churches of the Christian churches of the time.

However, during World War II, several synagogues were destroyed or significantly damaged. There has never been a central register of the properties of decentralized and autonomous communities, says Gusztáv Zoltai in 2010, the managing director of Mazsihisz (Association of Jewish Communities in Hungary). After World War II, much was demolished. Many buildings could not be maintained by the local Jewish community, whose membership dropped significantly due to the Holocaust and were sold to municipalities in the 1950s and 1960s. Several of the buildings sold in this way were renovated for cultural purposes - but there were some that were used as warehouses without any preservation. Some were transformed into shops and not one was demolished, as the simplistic architectural trends of the era did not favor the more ornate styles of the past. Examples are the huge Eger Synagogue, a Makó Neological Synagogue and Salgótarján synagogue. The memory of the destroyed Hungarian synagogues is now only photos and postcards. The situation is similar with other parts of the Carpathian Basin belonging to historical Hungary. (Southern Region, Croatian Territories, Highlands, Transylvania, Transcarpathia)

The list of Hungarian synagogues is not necessarily complete, as only a negligible number of sources testify to the existence of some synagogues. Edited by Péter Újvári in 1929, Budapest lists' 'Hungarian Jewish lexicon' 'lists several Hungarian settlements where a synagogue existed at the time of the book' s publication. Larger research into the still standing and already destroyed buildings began during the change of regime. In 1989 László Gerő  Synagogues in Hungary , in 2005 Hedvig Podonyi  Synagogues in Hungary  published photo albums. Larger than all this is Rudin Klein's 2011 book  Synagogues in Hungary 1782–1918 , who devoted no less than 678 pages to the issue. In 2019, 162 still existing synagogues were identified in a study organized by the Hebrew University of Jerusalem, which  „which is roughly a quarter of the number of synagogues before World War II.” If this estimate is correct, there were more than 600 synagogues in Hungary before 1939, and it seems that this number' 'does not include' 'many of the previously annexed Hungarian territories. synagogue.  “During the trip, [of the participants of the research tour] managed to visit 138 of the 162 buildings listed. Roughly 10,000 photos were taken and many synagogues were fully documented, and accurate floor plans were made for several buildings, such as the synagogue in Abony, Baja, Keszthely or Kővágóörs. ”

Budapest 
There are several synagogues in the Hungarian capital. Some of them work, some are not in religious use. It has recently undergone several major renovations.

Bács–Kiskun county

Baranya county

Békés county

Borsod–Abaúj–Zemplén county

Csongrád county

Fejér county

Győr–Moson–Sopron county

Hajdú–Bihar county

Heves county

Jász–Nagykun–Szolnok county

Komárom–Esztergom county

Nógrád county

Pest county

Somogy county

Szabolcs–Szatmár–Bereg county

Tolna county

Vas county

Veszprém county

Zala county

References

Sources 
 (szerk.) Gerő László: Magyarországi zsinagógák, Műszaki Könyvkiadó, Budapest, 1989, 
 Szegő György – Szegő Dóra: Zsinagógák, Budapest Főváros Önkormányzata Főpolgármesteri Hivatala, Budapest, 2004, 
 Podonyi Hedvig: Zsinagógák Magyarországon, Viva Média Holding, Budapest, 2005, 
 Klein Rudolf: Zsinagógák Magyarországon 1782–1918, TERC Kft., Budapest, 2011, 
 P. Brestyánszky Ilona: Budapest zsinagógái, Ciceró Könyvkiadó, Budapest, 1999, 
 Zsidó emlékek Tolna megyében
 Pusztay Sándor: Zsinagógák Szlovákiában – Zsinagógák, zsidó temetők, emlékhelyek, Kornétás Kiadó, 2018, 
 Gazda Anikó: Zsinagógák és zsidó községek Magyarországon. Térképek, rajzok, adatok, MTA Judaisztikai Kutatócsoport, Budapest, 1991,  online
 Report on the Expeditions to Hungary and the complete list of extant synagogue buildings in Hungary by the Center for Jewish Art at the Hebrew University of Jerusalem

Old postcards 
 http://magyarzsido.hu/index.php?option=com_catalogue&view=items&type_id=3&subtype_id=-1&Itemid=20
 http://judaica.cz/?page_id=2747
 http://judaica.cz/?page_id=8260
 http://judaica.cz/?page_id=8263
 http://judaica.cz/?page_id=8266
 http://judaica.cz/?page_id=8269
 http://judaica.cz/?page_id=2750

Hungary
Hungary
Synagogues